Albo may refer to:

People
Anthony Albanese, Australian politician and Prime Minister
Dave Albo (1962–), Virginia politician
Frank Albo, a researcher and teacher from the University of Winnipeg
Ida Albo, a managing partner of the Fort Garry Hotel in Winnipeg, Canada
Joseph Albo, 15th century Jewish rabbi
Robert Albo, American sports physician and magician

Other uses
Albo Hundred, a local legislative district of Sweden
Albo Panchina d'Oro (Golden Bench), an annual title awarded to the best Italian football (soccer) coach of the Serie A season
Monte Albo, a limestone massif 13 kilometres wide, in the central eastern portion of Island of Sardinia, Italy

See also
Albos (disambiguation)